Meyrin Fields is the first EP by the alternative rock band Broken Bells, made up of unreleased tracks from their debut album, Broken Bells. The instrumental version of "An Easy Life" was originally released as the b-side of "The High Road" single, and released with the vocals on the  iTunes LP edition of their self-titled album, and "Meyrin Fields" was originally the b-side of "The Ghost Inside." "Heartless Empire" was originally released as an instrumental, with strings replacing the vocals, which could be heard upon opening the music box edition of their 2010 self-titled album.

Track listing
All songs written by James Mercer and Brian "Danger Mouse" Burton.

References

2011 EPs
Broken Bells EPs
Columbia Records EPs
Albums produced by Danger Mouse (musician)
Space age pop EPs